Kaffe is a clean room design of a Java Virtual Machine.

Kaffe may also refer to:
 Kaffe (band), Bulgarian jazz band
 Kaffe Fassett, American-born artist known for colourful designs
 Kaffe (band), Bulgarian jazz band
 Kaffe Matthews, British electronic composer and sound artist
 A political ward of Gada, Nigeria

See also
 KAFF (disambiguation)